Isle of Hope is a census-designated place (CDP) in Chatham County, Georgia, United States. It is part of the Savannah Metropolitan Statistical Area, and at the 2020 U.S. census its population was 2,357. The island is one of the most affluent communities in the state and is well known for its historic plantations and exclusive waterfront properties.

Geography

Isle of Hope is located southeast of Savannah at  (31.983380, -81.055686). It consists of the northern half of the physical Isle of Hope, a body of land surrounded by tidal inlets: the Moon River and Herb River to the northwest, Grimball Creek to the northeast, and the Skidaway River and Skidaway Narrows, part of the Intracoastal Waterway, to the southeast. The CDP is bordered by the Dutch Island CDP to the northeast and the Skidaway Island CDP to the southeast. The Isle of Hope CDP includes the communities of Parkersburg and Wymberley.

Demographics

As of the census of 2000, there were 2,605 people, 1,001 households, and 783 families residing in the CDP. The racial makeup of the CDP was 98.27% White, 0.84% African American, 0.35% Asian, 0.27% from other races, and 0.27% from two or more races. Hispanic or Latino of any race were 1.07% of the population.

There were 1,001 households, out of which 36.0% had children under the age of 18 living with them, 67.6% were married couples living together, 8.1% had a female householder with no husband present, and 21.7% were non-families. 19.8% of all households were made up of individuals, and 10.2% had someone living alone who was 65 years of age or older.  The average household size was 2.60 and the average family size was 3.00.

In the CDP, the population was spread out, with 26.6% under the age of 18, 4.2% from 18 to 24, 25.4% from 25 to 44, 26.9% from 45 to 64, and 16.8% who were 65 years of age or older.  The median age was 42 years. For every 100 females, there were 92.5 males.  For every 100 females age 18 and over, there were 85.5 males.

The median income for a household in the CDP was $75,274, and the median income for a family was $79,586. Males had a median income of $52,175 versus $38,468 for females. The per capita income for the CDP was $34,067.  None of the families and 0.2% of the population were living below the poverty line, including no under eighteens and none of those over 64.

History

Isle of Hope is an island surrounded on all sides by water at high tide. Early maps referred to in French as "L'Isle Desperance" (modern French: L'Île d'Espérance). Legends abound of pirates using the island to hide their booty, and generations of children have gone digging for this treasure. Legend also states that French Huguenots used the island as a place of refuge for fleeing persecution.

In 1733, when General James Oglethorpe founded the Georgia colony, a surveyor named Noble Jones was granted a tract on the island that was eventually named Wormsloe, possibly after an English estate but more probably due to the mulberry trees that were grown there, the worms of which, it was hoped, would form the basis for a silk industry. A Colonial-era fortified home made of tabby was built at the Skidaway Narrows (now Jones' Narrows) and today can be visited as part of Wormsloe Historic Site.

Jones, along with James Fallowfield and Henry Parker, settled permanently on the island. During nearby Savannah's frequent yellow fever epidemics, the island was host to Savannahians fleeing the miasma of the city's fevers. As greater numbers of people discovered the island, the former plantation lands were subdivided and the lots sold, and it became a fashionable summer retreat. Several homes from the antebellum period remain, including the 1820 former caretaker's cottage of Carsten Hall plantation. Although the plantation itself burned in the early 20th century, the family moved into the caretaker's cottage overlooking the Intracoastal Waterway.

In the early 20th century, with better transportation options, the summer resort became the year-round home of many, and the terrapin farm at Barbee's Pavilion became world-famous for the export of terrapins for stew, including to the major restaurants of New York City and to the Czar of Russia. It was also the destination of race car drivers from around the world for the International Grand Prix races.

The Isle of Hope United Methodist Church is another historic location on the island.  Built before the Civil War, the property was used by the Confederates as an encampment and the church building as a hospital. During their recuperation, soldiers carved their initials into the pews, which they used for makeshift beds. When the old church burned down during its 1984 renovation, the pews had been removed and were saved. 33 Confederate soldiers are buried in the churchyard. In 2000, the church finished construction of transepts to the main sanctuary structure.

The island's beauty and history has attracted a number of Hollywood film productions, including the Oscar-winning Glory, the original Cape Fear, The Last of the Belles, Forrest Gump, and The Last Song.

Education

It is in the Savannah-Chatham County Public Schools. Schools include:
 Isle of Hope K-8 School

Notable people
Anna Davenport Raines, founding vice president of the United Daughters of the Confederacy
Associate Justice of the Supreme Court of the United States Clarence Thomas attended St. John Vianney's Minor Seminary on the Isle of Hope in the 1960s.
Jack Kingston, former congressman from the 1st District of Georgia

Gallery

References

External links

 Isle of Hope National Historic District historical marker

Census-designated places in Chatham County, Georgia
Census-designated places in Georgia (U.S. state)
Savannah metropolitan area
Populated coastal places in Georgia (U.S. state)